Stochastic Models is a peer-reviewed scientific journal that publishes papers on stochastic models. It is published by Taylor & Francis. It was established in 1985 under the title Communications in Statistics. Stochastic Models and obtained its current name in 2001. According to the Journal Citation Reports, the journal has a 2018 impact factor of 0.536. The founding editor-in-chief was Marcel F. Neuts, the current editor is Mark S. Squillante (IBM Thomas J. Watson Research Center).

References

External links 
 

Taylor & Francis academic journals
Publications established in 1985
Quarterly journals
Mathematics journals
English-language journals